Julie Labonté (born January 12, 1990, in Sainte-Justine, Quebec) is a Canadian track and field athlete competing in  shot put and discus.

Career
She finished 10th at the 2007 World Youth Championships in Athletics in Ostrava, Czech Republic, and 14th at the 2008 World Junior Championships in Athletics in Bydgoszcz, Poland. She won the gold medal in the shot put event at the 2008 Commonwealth Youth Games in Pune, India.

She won the 2011 NCAA Division 1 Indoor and Outdoor Championships as a part of the University of Arizona Wildcats. She placed 18th in the shot put at the 2011 World Championships in Athletics in Deagu, South Korea. Her personal best of 18.31 metres, achieved in Des Moines, Iowa, in 2011 currently stands as the Canadian record.

After finishing first in the shot put event 2012 Canadian Track and Field Championships in Calgary, and achieving an Olympic "A" standard during the outdoor season, she qualified to represent Canada at the shot put event at the 2012 Summer Olympics in London, finishing 22nd.

She participated at the 2013 Summer Universiade in Kazan, Russia where she finished 6th.

At the 2014 Commonwealth Games, she won the bronze medal, with a throw of 17.58 m.

Personal life
Labonté was born on January 12, 1990, in Sainte-Justine, Quebec, to parents Daniel Labonté and Celine Tanguay. She graduated from the University of Arizona in 2014 with a degree in family studies and human development.

References

External links
 IAAF profile

1990 births
Living people
Olympic track and field athletes of Canada
Athletes (track and field) at the 2012 Summer Olympics
People from Chaudière-Appalaches
Sportspeople from Quebec
Athletes (track and field) at the 2014 Commonwealth Games
Athletes (track and field) at the 2015 Pan American Games
Commonwealth Games bronze medallists for Canada
Canadian female shot putters
Commonwealth Games medallists in athletics
Canadian Track and Field Championships winners
Competitors at the 2013 Summer Universiade
Pan American Games track and field athletes for Canada
20th-century Canadian women
21st-century Canadian women
Medallists at the 2014 Commonwealth Games